The Bayer designation φ Lupi (Phi Lupi) is shared by two star systems in the constellation Lupus:
φ1 Lupi (HD 136422)
φ2 Lupi (HD 136664)

Lupi, Phi
Lupus (constellation)